Pak Mok-wol (6 January 1916 – 24 March 1978) was an influential Korean poet and academic.

Personal life
He was born Pak Yeongjong on January 6, 1916, in Moryang Village, Seo-myeon, Gyeongju, North Gyeongsang Province, in present-day South Korea, to parents Pak Jun-pil and Pak In-jae. He had a younger brother and two younger sisters. He graduated from Keisung Middle School (today Keisung High School) in Daegu in 1935. He lived in Tokyo from April 1937 until late 1939, during which period he devoted his time to writing. From September 1939 to September 1940, he had several of his poems published in the magazine . Afterwards, due to increasing wartime censorship by the Japanese colonial government, he continued writing privately but did not publish any further poetry until after the liberation of Korea. He was married to Yu Ik-sun, with whom he had four sons and a daughter.

Pak taught at various schools including Keisung Middle School and Ewha Girls' High School beginning in 1946, before joining the faculty of Hongik University as an assistant professor in 1953. In 1961 he took up a position as associate professor at Hanyang University (at which a statue was erected in his honor), and in 1963 he became a full professor there. He was later named the dean of the university's College of Humanities. He was a board member of the Society of Korean Poets from its founding in 1957, and was chosen as the society's chairman in 1968. He died on March 24, 1978, at his home in Wonhyoro-dong, Yongsan District, Seoul.

Work
Pak Mok-wol began his career as a member of Cheongrok-pa (the Blue Deer school), a group of three poets who also included Cho Chi-hun and Pak Tu-jin, all named after the 1946 anthology in which they appeared. Although they differed in style, their work largely had its basis in natural description and human aspiration. The body of Pak Mok-wol's work at this time established a new trend in Korean poetry, one that attempted to express childlike innocence and wonder at life through folk songs and dialectal poetic language.

Among such poems, "The Wayfarer" (나그네) is notable and was set by the musician Isang Yun as the last in his early song book Dalmuri (A Halo, 1950).

 
After his experiences during the Korean War, Pak's work shifted in style. Now he strove to incorporate the pain, death, and even monotony of daily existence into his poetry without maintaining a standard of sentimental and lyrical quality. His poetry collections, Wild Peach Blossoms (Sandohwa) and Orchids and Other Poems (Nan. Gita) encapsulate his artistic aim to depict the shifting human response to both the joys and sorrows of life. His later poems, however, represent a return to the use of vivid colloquial language as the medium through which to express the color and vitality of local culture.

His collection of poems from this later stylistic phase, Fallen Leaves in Gyeongsang-do (Gyeongsang-doui garangnip) provides the artistic forum through which he is able to further explore his earlier questions of the relationship between light and dark, happiness and despair, and life and death. Pak's poetry, especially his later work, reveals a fervent love for life that does not wane despite his diligent acknowledgment of the ever-present threat of the end. He is celebrated for the cautious optimism of his work and his ability to subtly internalize conflicts of empiric reality in his deceptively localized and dialectal poetry.

Awards and legacy

Pak's awards include the Freedom Literature Awards, May Literature and Art Awards, the Seoul City Culture Awards (1969), and the Moran Medal of the Order of Civil Merit (1972). In 2007, he was listed by the Korean Poets' Association among the ten most important modern Korean poets.

Pak lived in a  house in Wonhyoro-dong from 1965 until his death in 1978. The Seoul Municipal Government had expressed interest in preserving the house as a cultural heritage asset, but his son had to sell it to a real estate developer to cover debts in 2002, and the developer demolished the building in 2004. The demolition, along with similar incidents or near-misses involving the old houses of other cultural figures such as Choe Nam-seon and Seo Jeong-ju around the same time, sparked increasing public interest in the issue of cultural heritage preservation.

Bibliography
Adapted from:
Cheongrokjip 《靑鹿集》 (Seoul: Uryu Munhwasa [乙酉文化社], 1946. .) With Cho Chi-hun and Pak Tu-jin.
Sandohwa 《山桃花》 (Daegu: Yong-ung Chulpansa [英雄出版社], 1955. .)
Boratbit Somyo 《보랏빛 素描》 (Seoul: Sinheung Chulpansa [新興出版社], 1958. .)
Nan. Gita 《蘭·其他》 (Seoul: Singu Chulpansa [新丘文化社], 1959. .)
Sansaeal Mulsaeal 《산새알 물새알》 (Seoul: Munwonsa [文苑社], 1961. .)
Guwonui Yeon-ga 《久遠의 戀歌》 (Seoul: Gumunsa [歐文社], 1962. .) With Kim Nam-jo.
Cheongdam 《晴曇》 (Seoul: Iljogak [一潮閣], 1964. .)
Eomeoni 《어머니》 (Seoul: Samjungdang [三中堂], 1967. .)
Gyeongsang-doui Garang-nip 《慶尙道의 가랑잎》 (Seoul: Minjung Seogwan [民衆書館], 1968. .)
Cheongrokjip Gita 《靑鹿集 其他》 (Seoul: Hyeonamsa [玄岩社], 1968. .) With Cho Chi-hun and Pak Tu-jin.
Cheongrokjip Ihu 《青鹿集 以後》 (Seoul: Hyeonamsa [玄岩社], 1968. .) With Cho Chi-hun and Pak Tu-jin.
Musun 《無順》 (Seoul: Samjungdang [三中堂], 1976. .)

Works in translation
 Selected Poems of Pak Mogwol, English (박목월 시선집. Uchang Kim, translator. Berkeley: Asian Humanities Press, 1990. .)
 Le Passant, French (나그네. Kim Hyeon-ju and Pierre Mesini, translators. Marseille: Autres Temps, 2000. .)
 《过客》, Chinese (나그네. Heo Se-uk [許世旭], translator. Tianjin: Baihua Wenyi Chubanshe [百花文艺出版社], 2003. .)

See also
List of Koreans
Korean literature
List of Korean-language poets

References

External links
The Dong-ri Mog-wol Literary Museum 
PDF file of an English-language article on Gyeongju by Park Mok-Wol, published in Korea Journal in 1965
Short laudatory overview and biography

1916 births
1978 deaths
20th-century Korean poets
20th-century male writers
Korean writers
Korean male poets
People from Gyeongju
Academic staff of Hanyang University
Academic staff of Hongik University